Jamie Dodds (born November 12, 1981 in Hamilton, Ontario) is a Canadian former soccer player who played at the professional level most notability in the USL A-League (later renamed USL First Division), and later in the Canadian Soccer League. His most notable experience was with the Toronto Lynx, where he received numerous team awards. He later played in the Hamilton region both at the amateur and professional level where he competed in several tournaments.

Playing career

Early years & Toronto Lynx 
Dodds played college soccer for Robert Morris University in Pittsburgh, where he earned First Team All Northeast Conference honours from 2001–2003. In 2004, he was drafted by the Toronto Lynx of the USL A-League. His signing was announced in a press conference which revealed the team roster for the upcoming season. He made his debut for the club on April 17, 2004 in a match against Puerto Rico Islanders coming on as a substitute for Tyler Hughes. In his rookie season, he played 25 games while missing only two matches, and scored two goals and recorded two assists. At the end of the season Dodds finished in the top five for the Lynx in games and minutes played.

On March 17, 2005 the Lynx announced the re-signing of Dodds for the 2005 season. He had a productive season despite Toronto finishing the season last in the standings; where he recorded 6 goals and recorded 3 assists making him the top team goal scorer and co-leader in assists. When the season came to a conclusion Dodds was named the Lynx Most Valuable Player.

In April 2006, Dodds signed a new contract with the club and entered his third season. In his third season Dodds was a key member in the Lynx midfield, scoring 6 goals and recording 7 assists. He earned the Lynx Best Offensive Player award, and was selected for USL All-Star match against English club Sheffield Wednesday. He also featured in the 2006 Open Canada Cup tournament where he appeared in the 2nd round of the tournament against the Serbian White Eagles FC, where he scored both goals in a 2-2 draw which concluded in a victory for Toronto in a penalty shootout. Ultimately Toronto would reach the final of the tournament. Once the season came to a conclusion the Lynx franchise dropped two divisions down to the USL Premier Development League, which resulted in Dodds being released from his contract along with all the other professional senior players.

Hamilton 
On February 9, 2007 he returned to his hometown and signed with Hamilton Croatia in the Ontario Soccer League (OSL). In 2009, he was named the OSL's Provincial West division's MVP. He returned to professional soccer for the 2010 season when Hamilton joined the Canadian Soccer League. He made his CSL debut on May 15, 2010 in a 2-1 victory over TFC Academy. Throughout the season he assisted in Croatia securing a postseason berth by finishing third in the First Division, and featured in the CSL Championship final against Brantford Galaxy, in a losing effort. In 2011, he played with the Hamilton Serbians and contributed the winning goal in securing the Hamilton Spectator Cup against Hamilton Sparta.

Personal life  
His brother Rhian Dodds was also a professional soccer player who played in the Scottish Premiership.

References

1981 births
Living people
Canadian expatriate sportspeople in the United States
Canadian expatriate soccer players
Canadian Soccer League (1998–present) players
Canadian soccer players
Expatriate soccer players in the United States
Association football midfielders
Soccer players from Hamilton, Ontario
Robert Morris Colonials men's soccer players
Canadian people of Scottish descent
Hamilton Croatia players
Toronto Lynx players
USL First Division players
A-League (1995–2004) players
London City players